Drosera marchantii is an erect perennial tuberous species in the carnivorous plant genus Drosera. It is endemic to Western Australia and grows in a variety of habitats, including swampy areas and hilltops in laterite-silica sand soils. Its pink flowers emerge from June to October.

Drosera marchantii was first described and named by Larry Eugene DeBuhr in 1975. In 1992, N. G. Marchant and Allen Lowrie published the formal description of D. marchantii subsp. prophylla, a subspecies that is distinguished by its white flowers, smaller height, and numerous bracts (prophylls) on the lower part of the stem. It has only been found in a small area north of Perth and is listed by Western Australia's Department of Environment and Conservation as a priority three poorly known taxon on the Declared Rare and Priority Flora List.

See also
List of Drosera species

References

Carnivorous plants of Australia
Caryophyllales of Australia
Eudicots of Western Australia
Plants described in 1975
marchantii